João Vítor Rocha de Carvalho Moreira (born 7 February 1986) is a Portuguese professional footballer who plays for New Zealand club Manukau United FC as a forward.

Club career
Moreira was born in Amadora, Lisbon. Still a youngster, he made his Primeira Liga debut with C.F. Estrela da Amadora and, after that season, signed a five-year contract with Valencia CF, but was immediately loaned out to Rayo Vallecano.

Moreira played one season with the latter club's B side, being relegated from Segunda División B. Still under loan, he then spent the 2007–08 campaign with C.D. Nacional and Leixões SC, being released in June 2008 by the Spaniards without any official appearances and dropping down to his country's Segunda Liga by joining S.C. Beira-Mar.

On 26 June 2009, Moreira underwent a trial at Heart of Midlothian alongside compatriot Zezinando. An eventual deal fell through, and he returned to Estrela after four years.

Moreira left for Spain again in June 2010, agreeing to a one-year contract with UE Lleida in division three. He stayed in that country and tier for 2011–12 and joined Real Balompédica Linense, but was released by the latter in January 2012.

On 18 December 2012, Moreira signed for the only professional football team in Brunei, DPMM FC, joining alongside Stéphane Auvray as one of the foreign players for the 2013 season of the S.League. On 6 February 2014 he switched to the New Zealand Football Championship with Auckland City FC, making his first league appearance ten days later when he started and scored once in the 10–0 away demolition of Southern United FC.

Moreira netted six times in as many games during the 2017 edition of the OFC Champions League – including twice in a 2–0 final first leg defeat of Team Wellington FC – helping the club to the seventh consecutive accolade in the competition (fourth during his tenure). On 14 October of that year, the 31-year-old left Kiwitea Street.

References

External links

1986 births
Living people
People from Amadora
Portuguese sportspeople of Cape Verdean descent
Black Portuguese sportspeople
Portuguese footballers
Footballers from Lisbon
Association football forwards
Primeira Liga players
Liga Portugal 2 players
Segunda Divisão players
C.F. Estrela da Amadora players
C.D. Nacional players
Leixões S.C. players
S.C. Beira-Mar players
Segunda División B players
Tercera División players
Valencia CF Mestalla footballers
Rayo Vallecano players
UE Lleida players
Real Balompédica Linense footballers
UD Almansa players
Singapore Premier League players
DPMM FC players
New Zealand Football Championship players
New Zealand National League players
Auckland City FC players
Team Wellington players
Miramar Rangers AFC players
Maltese Premier League players
Hibernians F.C. players
South African Premier Division players
Lamontville Golden Arrows F.C. players
Portugal youth international footballers
Portugal under-21 international footballers
Portuguese expatriate footballers
Expatriate footballers in Spain
Expatriate footballers in Brunei
Expatriate footballers in Singapore
Expatriate association footballers in New Zealand
Expatriate footballers in Malta
Expatriate soccer players in South Africa
Portuguese expatriate sportspeople in Spain

Portuguese expatriate sportspeople in South Africa